This list contains the names of albums that contain a hidden track and also information on how to find them. Not all printings of an album contain the same track arrangements, so some copies of a particular album may not have the hidden track(s) listed below. Some of these tracks may be hidden in the pregap, and some hidden simply as a track following the listed tracks. The list is ordered by artist name using the surname where appropriate.

 R.E.M.:
 Murmur (1983): A short snippet of a song is featured between "Shaking Through" and "We Walk."
 Murmur (25th Anniversary Deluxe Edition): A vintage radio promo for the original Murmur album is hidden in the bonus disc's pregap.
 Reckoning (1984): A short, untitled song plays in between "Camera" and "(Don't Go Back To) Rockville" and another is featured on the first pressing of the album at the end of final track "Little America;" this was restored on the Mobile Fidelity Sound Lab gold re-pressing of the album.
 Reckoning (25th Anniversary Deluxe Edition): A vintage radio promo for the original Reckoning album is hidden in the bonus disc's pregap.
 Lifes Rich Pageant (1986):
 Track 6, "Underneath the Bunker," is not mentioned on album cover, but listed on the CD and vinyl themselves.
 "Superman" plays at the end of the album, again unlisted on the album cover but listed on the CD and vinyl themselves.
 Green (1988): The Eleventh Untitled Song: featured on track 11.
 Monster (1994): A short snippet of a song plays at the end of "Bang and Blame."
 Up (1998): "I'm Not Over You" plays at the end of "Diminished."
 The following three hidden tracks feature on the band's DVDs.
 Parallel: At the end of track 24, a screen will appear saying R.E.M. ABC. It will then go through the letters of the alphabeat while showing footage of the band and songs.
 Tourfilm: Halfway during the credits, R.E.M. perform a live music video for the remainder of the credits. Once the credits are finished, shots of the band will be displayed.
 When the Light Is Mine: The Best of the I.R.S. Years 1982–1987: When watching the music video for "Radio-Free Europe," it is possible to click the enter button, which will then show an alternative music video for the song. A similar thing applies for the music video given to "Driver 8."
 Radiohead:
 Pablo Honey (1993): A clean version of track 2, "Creep," plays as track 13 on some editions of the album
 Kid A includes a hidden track in the final track, "Motion Picture Soundtrack." The track has no official title, but is commonly referred to as "Untitled" or "Genchildren". The hidden track starts at about 4:17 and ends at 5:09, with the remaining 1:52 being silent.
 Rainer Maria: Catastrophe Keeps Us Together (2006): Cities Above picks up right where the song left off earlier, several minutes after the end of I'll Keep It With Mine.
 Rage Against the Machine, Renegades (2000): Contains 2 hidden tracks following a short period of silence after "Maggie's Farm" ends. The tracks are live versions of "Kick Out the Jams" and "How I Could Just Kill a Man."
 Rammstein:
 Sehnsucht (1997): Track 12, Depeche Mode's cover "Stripped", is not shown on the back of the CD in some editions. Also on some editions there are two hidden tracks: English versions of "Engel" (Track 12) and "Du Hast" (Track 13). They are not mentioned on the back cover.
 Live aus Berlin (1999): Nulltrack: 59 seconds of crowd noise.
 Mutter (2001): Hidden track "Hallelujah" plays at the end of "Nebel" on the Japanese edition of the album.
 Reise, Reise (2004): Nulltrack: 35 seconds of a flight recorder (JAL123).
 Ramones:
 Loco Live (American Version) (1992): "Carbona Not Glue" plays at the end of "Pet Sematary."
 Adios Amigos (American Version) (1995): "Spider-Man" plays at the end of "Born To Die in Berlin"
 Rancid, Rancid: The fifteenth track "Union Blood" is not listen on the album and is featured between "Unwritten Rules" and "Get Out of My Way."
 Rascal Flatts, Feels Like Today: Features "Skin (Sarabeth)" as a hidden track. This hidden track is notable in that it was actually released as a single.
 Rasputina, Cabin Fever: A brief lullaby plays within the last track, "A Quitter," following several minutes of silence.
 Marion Raven, Set Me Free: After the last song "All I Wanna Do Is You," there is a bit of silence and then the hidden track "Let Me Introduce Myself (Acoustic Version)"
 Reamonn: Tuesday (2000): "Letter From My Sister" is a hidden track at 8:32 after a period of silence following the last song "Just A Day"
 The Receiving End of Sirens, Between the Heart and the Synapse (2005): After approximately seven minutes of silence after the final song, "Epilogue," a short vocoder-based hidden track reprising several lyrical themes from the album.
 Red Jumpsuit Apparatus, Don't You Fake It (2006): The seven-minute song "Grim Goodbye" follows after over a minute of silence after the song "Your Guardian Angel"
 Reel Big Fish:
 Turn the Radio Off (1996): A few minutes of silence after "Alternative Baby," followed by a scratchy acoustic version of "I'm Cool"
 Why Do They Rock So Hard? (1998): Several minutes of silence follow Victory Over Peter Bones, and then an assortment of jamming sessions and puerile jokes
 Cheer Up! (2000): Included as part of the final track. Several minutes of silence following the end of "Drunk Again" and then the hidden track plays
 We're Not Happy 'Til You're Not Happy (2006): Several minutes of silence follow 'Your Guts (I Hate 'Em)' then a sound collage known as "You're Gonna Die" plays.
 Fionn Regan, The End of History ("Campaign Button" follows "Bunker or Basement" after a period of silence.)
 Relient K:
 Relient K "Call Us Rock Stars (Punk Rock Picnic)" (After a period of silence following the song "K Car")
 The Anatomy of the Tongue in Cheek: "Skittles and Combos" (after a period of silence following the song "Less Is More"), replaced by "The Ballad of Tim Eddings" for the gold edition of this album
 Two Lefts Don't Make a Right...but Three Do: "Silly Shoes" (after a period of silence following the song "Jefferson Aero Plane")
 Deck the Halls, Bruise Your Hand: Beginning at 3:34 on track 10 ("Auld Lang Syne"), there is a 24.5 second clip of an altered version of "12 Days of Christmas." This is not on all copies.
 Mmhmm: "Mmhmm" (By rewinding "The One I'm Waiting For" into 16 seconds of negative time; listed as track 0)
 Rembrandts, The, LP (1995). "I'll Be There for You" (a.k.a. the theme for "Friends" television program) originally appeared as a hidden 15th track on the CD. The then-incomplete song was in heavy radio demand due to the success of the television show, so the song was fully recorded and added as an 11th-hour addition to the CD, although there was not enough time to amend the sleeve notes.
 Remy Zero, The Golden Hum (2001): A few minutes of silence follow "Impossibility", then the hidden track "Sub Balloon" plays.
 Res, How I Do (2001): About a minute of silence follows "Tsunami", then the hidden track "Say It Anyway" plays (on the Special Edition cd, "Say It Anyway" plays about a minute after the bonus track, "Toxic You").
 Chris Rice: Past the Edges: A humorous hidden track "Cartoons" (aka "The Cartoon Song").
 Damien Rice:
 O: "Prague" at 7:07 and "Silent Night" at 14:03 of final track "Eskimo"
 9: "9 Crimes (Demo)" in the pregap of the first track.
 John Rich, Underneath the Same Moon: A hidden track, not listed on the album, found after the album's last song. Hidden track consists of an impromptu conversation between Rich and another, unknown person.
 Rich Boy, Rich Boy (2007): "Let's Get This Paper/Balla Life" starts playing after "Ghetto Rich."
 Riddlin' Kids, Hurry Up and Wait: Following some silence after "It's the End of the World as we Know It," the hidden track "Believe" plays.
 Rick Ross, God Forgives, I Don't: There is two hidden skits after the track "Ten Jesus Pieces".
 Rise Against: “Revolutions per Minute (Rise Against album)” (2003): Cover of Journey (band)’s song Any Way You Want It hidden on the CD listed as ‘Data’.
 Robyn: "My Truth" (1999): A song in Swedish, "Det Gör Ont Ibland," is hidden in the pre-gap preceding track 1.
 Robert Plant, Mighty ReArranger (2005): After the song "Brother Ray," there is a minute of silence, and then a remixed, longer version of "Shine it all around."
 Rocket Park, The Effects of Eating too Much Television (2000): A cover of the Starland Vocal Band's "Afternoon Delight" follows the last listed track, "So Long."
 Rolling Stones:
 Their Satanic Majesties Request (1967): At the end of side one, immediately following the song "Sing This All Together (See What Happens)," is a brief unlisted song sometimes known by fans as "Cosmic Christmas," consisting of tympanic and breezy electronic noise accompanying what sounds like a theremin playing a dissonant rendition of "We Wish You a Merry Christmas." Considering that the Rolling Stones' album was a response to The Beatles' Sgt. Pepper's Lonely Hearts Club Band, the song may be a parody of that album's runoff groove track.
 Dirty Work (1986)- Track 11 is an uncredited recording of "Key to the Highway" performed by Ian Stewart, who died on 12 December 1985 just following Dirty Work's completion.
 Rollins Band, Get Some Go Again contains a hidden track called "L.A. Money Train," a 14-minute funk song, on track 14.
 Gavin Rossdale, Wanderlust: Track 13 is a hidden a cappella song "This Place Is on Fire," which was the original title for the album.
 The Roots, Phrenology: After approx 4 minutes of silence at the end of the album, 2 songs (Liquor Shot & Thirsty) will play.
 Carina Round, Slow Motion Addict: Hidden track "Same Girlfriend" is included in the pre-gap before track one on some editions of the CD. Also available as an iTunes bonus track.
 Röyksopp
 Melody A.M.: There is a phone call conversation in the pregap between tracks 1 & 2
 Senior: The track "The Final Day" is a hidden track that plays after silence when track 9 finishes.
 The Rubens, Lo La Ru: "Young Me" is the unlisted hidden song following the final listed track "All My Dollars".
 Paulina Rubio, Pau-Latina: "Algo Tienes (A cappella)" after three minutes of silence of the final track "Algo Tienes (Instrumental)"

See also
 List of backmasked messages
 List of albums with tracks hidden in the pregap

References 

R